Alessandro Bignozzi is an Italian bobsledder who competed in the early 1970s. He won a silver medal in the four-man event at the 1971 FIBT World Championships in Cervinia.

References
Bobsleigh four-man world championship medalists since 1930

Italian male bobsledders
Possibly living people
Year of birth missing (living people)